Lekbibaj is a village and a former municipality Tropojë northern Albania. At the 2015 local government reform it became a subdivision of the municipality Tropojë. The population at the 2011 census was 1,207. It is the historical center of the Nikaj-Mërturi region.

Etymology
The etymology of this village's name is in Albanian, as it is a binary word comprising Leke+Bibaj (Lek being an Albanian personal name as well as bibe, an Albanian word and personal name related to a kind of bird.

References

Former municipalities in Kukës County
Administrative units of Tropojë
Villages in Kukës County